El Súper is a 1979 Spanish-language comedy-drama film directed by Leon Ichaso and Orlando Jiménez Leal, based on a stage play by Iván Acosta.  The film is a look at life in the U.S. from the perspective of frustrated Cuban exiles.

Plot summary
Roberto and Aurelia are ten-year exiles from Castro's Cuba, now residing in New York City with their 17-year-old daughter Aurelita.  Roberto has become the super of the building in which he lives, with the troubles of his tenants and his overall discontentment with his current living situation driving the plot of the film. He and his wife have trouble understanding their daughter, who smokes pot and likes to disco dance; this is further compounded by the problems she gets into during the latter half of the film, including a pregnancy scare with potentially multiple men.

Roberto spends the majority of the film conversing with other exiles, such as Pancho, a fellow Cuban, and Cuco, an exile from Puerto Rico; he also tries to find a way to move to Miami to escape from New York, as he feels that, despite the escape from Cuba, that this was a waste of his past ten years and seeks to live out the remainder of his life in peace. After Roberto makes his wish come true by finding a factory job in the area, he celebrates both his wife's birthday and the family's moving out with a grand party; the ending of the film has Roberto desperately laughing in the dim basement, playing further into the isolation he's felt in the past decade.

Cast
 Raimundo Hidalgo-Gato ... El Super
 Zully Montero ... Aurelia
 Elizabeth Peña ... Aurelita
 Reynaldo Medina ... Pancho
 Juan Granda ... Cuco
 Hilda Lee ... La China
 Phil Joint ... Inspector
 Jaime Soriano...Preacher

External links

1979 films
1970s Spanish-language films
American comedy-drama films
1979 directorial debut films
Films directed by Leon Ichaso
1970s English-language films
1970s American films